Nancy Charlton (born 8 October 1962) is a Canadian former field hockey player who competed in the 1984 Summer Olympics and in the 1988 Summer Olympics.

Charlton was born in Victoria, British Columbia, Canada.

References

External links
 
 
 

1962 births
Living people
Field hockey players from Victoria, British Columbia
Canadian female field hockey players
Olympic field hockey players of Canada
Field hockey players at the 1984 Summer Olympics
Field hockey players at the 1988 Summer Olympics
Pan American Games medalists in field hockey
Pan American Games bronze medalists for Canada
Field hockey players at the 1987 Pan American Games
Medalists at the 1987 Pan American Games